Gnomoniopsis is a genus of fungi belonging to the family Gnomoniaceae.

The genus was first described by Augusto Napoleone Berlese in 1892.

Species:
 Gnomoniopsis castanea
 Gnomoniopsis comari
 Gnomoniopsis idaeicola

References

Gnomoniaceae